is a sports and entertainment facility in Chuo-ku, Fukuoka, Japan. The building was opened by Kyushu Electric Power in 1964, and transferred to the city of Fukuoka in 2003, with the land loaned at no cost. It has a seating capacity of 1,992, with provision for a further 380 standing spectators. In April 2013, Kyushu Electric Power announced that it was planning to sell the site to make up for losses accrued due to the shutdown of its nuclear reactors following the 2011 Tohoku earthquake and tsunami. The building will however remain in use until 2019, by which date a new facility is scheduled to be completed in Higashi-ku, Fukuoka.

References

External links
  

Basketball venues in Japan
Music venues in Japan
Buildings and structures in Fukuoka
1964 establishments in Japan
Rizing Zephyr Fukuoka